Egeland ("Oakland") may refer to:

Places
Egeland, also known as Aiboland and Swedish Estonia, historical region in northern and western Estonia
Egeland, North Dakota, small settlement ("city") in Towner County, North Dakota, United States

People
Allan Egeland (born 1973), Canadian ice hockey player
Alv Egeland (born 1932), Norwegian physicist
Erik Egeland (1921–1996), Norwegian journalist and art critic
Jan Egeland (born 1957), Norwegian politician
John Olav Egeland (born 1951), Norwegian journalist
John Oscar Egeland (1891–1985), Norwegian businessman in shipping
Kjølv Egeland (1918–1999), Norwegian politician
Lars Egeland (born 1957), Norwegian librarian and politician
Tom Egeland (born 1959), Norwegian writer

See also
Ekland
Ekeland
Eikeland

Surnames of Norwegian origin